is a Japanese television jidaigeki or period drama that was broadcast in 1978. It is the 13th in the Hissatsu series, and was inspired by Hokusai's One Hundred Views of Mount Fuji. The lead star is Masaya Oki. Eitaro Ozawa played Hokusai.

Cast
Masaya Oki as Tōjurō
Isuzu Yamada as Oen
Gannosuke Ashiya
Kimie Shingyoji as Usagi
Hideko Yoshida
Eiji Okada
Eitaro Ozawa as Hokusai

See also
 Hissatsu Shikakenin (first in the Hissatsu series) 
 Hissatsu Shiokinin  (second in the Hissatsu series) 
 Shin Hissatsu Shiokinin (tenth in the Hissatsu series)

References

1978 Japanese television series debuts
1970s drama television series
Jidaigeki television series